Apteranthes is a genus of flowering plants belonging to the family Apocynaceae.

Its native range is Canary Islands, Mediterranean to Indian subcontinent.

Species:

Apteranthes burchardii 
Apteranthes europaea 
Apteranthes faucicola 
Apteranthes joannis 
Apteranthes munbyana 
Apteranthes staintonii 
Apteranthes tuberculata

References

Apocynaceae
Apocynaceae genera